Bluto, at times  known as Brutus, is a cartoon and comics character created in 1932 by Elzie Crisler Segar as a one-time character, named "Bluto the Terrible", in his Thimble Theatre comic strip (later renamed Popeye). Bluto made his first appearance on September 12 of that year. Fleischer Studios adapted him the next year (1933) to be the main antagonist of their theatrical Popeye animated cartoon series.

Character

Bluto is a cruel, bearded, muscular bully who serves as Popeye's nemesis and archrival for the love of Olive Oyl. He usually uses brute force and/or trickery to accomplish his various goals. His voice is very loud, harsh and deep, with an incomprehensible bear-like growl between words and sentences. This voice, as well as the dark beard, crooked teeth, and bulk, was similar to that of the villain, well known at the time, Red Flack in the 1930 film The Big Trail, played by Tyrone Power Sr.

Bluto, like Popeye, is enamored of Olive Oyl, and he often attempts to kidnap her. However, with the help of some spinach, Popeye usually ends up defeating him. Some cartoons portray Popeye and Bluto as Navy buddies, although in these episodes Bluto usually turns on Popeye when an object of interest (usually Olive) is put between them.

Bluto's strength is portrayed inconsistently. In some episodes, he is weaker than Popeye and resorts to underhanded trickery to accomplish his goals. At other times, Popeye stands no chance against Bluto in a fight until he eats his spinach. In yet other cartoons, the two characters are closely matched, with Bluto eventually gaining the upper hand before Popeye eats his spinach and defeats Bluto. In some shorts, Bluto is a match for Popeye even after he has eaten his spinach. Bluto is sometimes portrayed as having a glass jaw. He has, on occasion, been knocked out by Olive Oyl and even by Popeye's infant ward Swee'Pea. On rare occasions, Bluto tries to sabotage Popeye before confronting him, such as when he tried to thwart his own defeat by using a forklift to steal Popeye's store of spinach cans and disposing of them in a garbage dump. In one case, Popeye forces a defeated Bluto to consume spinach, after which Bluto easily beats up Popeye, resulting in Olive pitying him and choosing him over Bluto.

In most cases, the name "Bluto" is used as a first name. In cartoons where Bluto portrays alternate characters, or "roles," the name can be used as a surname, as with lumberjack "Pierre Bluto" in the cartoon Axe Me Another and etiquette teacher "Professor Bluteau" in Learn Polikeness.

Bluto vs. Brutus
After the theatrical Popeye cartoon series ceased production in 1957, Bluto's name was changed to Brutus because it was incorrectly believed by King Features that Paramount Pictures, distributors of the Fleischer Studios (later Famous Studios) cartoons, owned the rights to the name "Bluto". King Features actually owned the name, as Bluto had been originally created for the comic strip. Due to a lack of thorough research, King Features failed to realize this and reinvented him as Brutus to avoid supposed copyright problems. "Brutus" (often pronounced "Brutusk" by Popeye) appears in the 1960–62 Popeye the Sailor television cartoons with his physical appearance changed, making him obese rather than muscular. He normally sported a blue shirt and brown pants. Brutus later appeared in the Popeye arcade game released by Nintendo.

The character reverted to Bluto for Hanna-Barbera's The All-New Popeye Hour (1978–83) and the 1980 live-action Popeye movie, as well as the 1987 Popeye and Son series also by Hanna-Barbera. The character was also named Bluto in the 2004 movie Popeye's Voyage: The Quest for Pappy.

It was long accepted that Bluto and Brutus were one and the same. However, a 1988 Popeye comic book, published by Ocean Comics, presented the two characters as twin brothers. The Popeye comic strip, at the time written and drawn by Hy Eisman, generally featured only Brutus, but added Bluto as Brutus' twin brother in several 2008 and 2009 strips. The two continue to appear as brothers in the more recent strips by Randy Milholland.

Voice
In the Paramount theatrical cartoons, Bluto was voiced by a number of actors, including William Pennell, Gus Wickie, Jack Mercer, Pinto Colvig, Dave Barry, Tedd Pierce, and Jackson Beck, who took over the role in 1944. Beck also supplied the voice for Brutus in the early 1960s. In the 1980 live-action movie, he was portrayed by Paul L. Smith. In The All-New Popeye Hour and Popeye and Son, he was voiced by Allan Melvin. In Popeye's Voyage: The Quest for Pappy, he was voiced by Garry Chalk.

Other characters
In the animated cartoons Popeye's foe is almost always Bluto functioning in some capacity (fellow sailor, generic thug, carnival hypnotist, sheik, lecherous instructor, etc.). However, in the Famous-era shorts there have also been "original" one-time characters with Bluto-like personalities and mannerisms such as the blond, beardless lifeguard in "Beach Peach". Jackson Beck voiced these characters using the same voice.

References

External links
 Popeye at Don Markstein's Toonopedia

Animated human characters
Villains in animated television series
Comic strip villains
Comics characters introduced in 1932
Comics characters with superhuman strength
Fictional criminals
Fictional kidnappers
Fictional sailors
Male characters in animation
Male characters in comics
Popeye characters